Jefferson Historic District may refer to:

in the United States
(by state)
Jefferson Historic District (Jefferson, Alabama), listed on the NRHP in Alabama
Jefferson Historic District (Jefferson, Georgia), listed on the NRHP in Jackson County, Georgia
Jefferson Historic District (Lafayette, Indiana), listed on the NRHP in Tippecanoe County, Indiana
Jefferson Historic District (Jefferson, Texas), listed on the NRHP in Marion County, Texas
Jefferson Avenue Historic District (Ogden, Utah)